Salman Abdulrahman Al-Ansari is a Saudi Arabian political analyst and media commentator on issues relating to international relations in the Middle East. Al-Ansari is the founder and President of the Saudi American Public Relation Affairs Committee (SAPRAC) based in Washington, D.C.

As a public figure on issues involving Saudi Arabia, Al-Ansari has contributed to the political discussion, economic development, and social matters between Saudi Arabia and global community. In his role as president of SAPRAC, Al-Ansari advocates strengthening of the relations between the United States and Saudi Arabia through advocacy efforts involving the production of academic papers, media commentary, and event organization.

Early life and education

Prior to university, Salman Al-Ansari was engaged in professional development in financial education services with SAMBA, one of the Middle East's largest and most acclaimed financial service institutes. Al-Ansari received certificates and licensing in investment and brokerage as well as trained in world financial security, problem solving and decision making, clerical training, and Islamic banking. Thereafter, he began his early career in business and financial sectors involving counter terrorist finance (CTF) and anti-money laundering (ALM).

As part of the King Abdullah Scholarship Program, Al-Ansari received a bachelor's degree in international communication from Saint Louis University (SLU) in Madrid, Spain in 2013. Besides his native Arabic language, he is fluent in both English and Spanish after receiving an English Language diploma from Horizon Institute in 2007 and a minor diploma in Spanish from SLU in 2013.

Salman Al-Ansari's early life educational experiences provided a basis for his business successes and rounded understanding of issues and opportunities most important to the Middle East, United States, and the international community. Over the years, Al-Ansari has sought to provide understanding for developing initiatives that initiate societal development and deter influences that threaten and disrupt civil society, financial structures, and social stability.

Career

In 2004, Salman Al-Ansari began his career in financial services as a stockbroker and premier customer office in Riyadh at the Saudi British Bank (SABB). In 2007, he became the manager of local shares at the Watan Investment Company Position in Riyadh and served as supervisor of Tadawul (stock market) brokerage in the local shares market preparing policies and procedures pertaining to the company's operations. From 2008 to 2010, he managed corporate communication and product Sales for SAMBA Financial Group in Riyad, where he provided expertise in e-commerce and cash management solutions to corporate and governmental institutions.

From 2013 to 2014, Al-Ansari was the quality and project manager at EDEX, an online learning company based in the Middle East. His focus entailed developing and revising policies and procedures for the general operation of the compliance program and its related activities to prevent illegal, unethical, and improper conduct. From 2014 to 2015, he was an account director at Thomas Reuters in Saudi Arabia. In the same year, the company was awarded the best enterprise deal in MENA in 2014.

Public relations and advocacy

Salman Al-Ansari began his public relation advocacy in 2013 by founding and becoming the CEO of Margin Scope PR and media agency. The agency has been focused on exposing corruption, terrorism, links to financing of terrorist groups, and other issues in the Middle East involving the US and Saudi Arabia adversaries.

In March 2016, he founded the Saudi American Public Relation Affairs Committee (SAPRAC), based in Washington, D.C., to ensure communication strategies that strengthen the US and Saudi Arabia relations are implemented for the shared benefits of both the US and Saudi Arabian societies.

Al-Ansari has been noted for its campaign against Qatar’s sponsorship of terrorism and its relations with the Muslim Brotherhood, Hamas and Hezbollah - internationally recognized terrorist organizations. He also criticized Canadian society by posting a video of a Canadian woman being racist towards a Syrian immigrant in Canada.

He is a frequent contributor on The Hill, as well as a frequent guest on TV channels such as Al-Arabiya, Sky News, BBC and other international media platforms, such as CNN and CNN Arabic.

See also

Saudi Arabia–United States relations
Saudi American Public Relation Affairs Committee

References

External links
SAPRAC official website

1985 births
Living people
Lobbyists